Proibito (Forbidden) is a 1954 Italian drama film directed by Mario Monicelli and starring Mel Ferrer.

Cast
 Mel Ferrer as Don Paolo Solinas
 Amedeo Nazzari as Costantino Corraine
 Lea Massari as Agnese Barras
 Henri Vilbert as Niccodemo Barras
 Germaine Kerjean as Maddalena Solinas
 Paolo Ferrara as Maresciallo Taddei
 Eduardo Ciannelli as Vescovo
 Decimo Cristiani as Antonio
 Ornella Spegni as La vedova Casu
 Memmo Luisi as Antioco
 Marco Guglielmi as Mareddu

References

External links

1954 films
1954 drama films
1950s Italian-language films
Films scored by Nino Rota
Films based on works by Grazia Deledda
Films shot in Sardinia
Films directed by Mario Monicelli
Films set in Sardinia
Films with screenplays by Suso Cecchi d'Amico
Italian drama films
1950s Italian films